Parasitic People is the second album Japanese group Super Junky Monkey, released in 1996. It showed the group honing and integrating their influences into a very complex and (to some) unlistenable recording. It was released in Japan and the United States.

Track listing
Introduction
The Words
If
Parasitic People
Gokai (Misunderstanding)
Our Universe
Nani (What)
Telepathy
Start With Makin’ A Fire
Burn System’s Flag
Kappa
The True Parasites
See Me, Feel Me
New Song
Tairiku No Kodoh (Pulsation’s Continent)

References

1996 albums
Super Junky Monkey albums